The IAR 37 was a 1930s Romanian reconnaissance or light bomber aircraft built by Industria Aeronautică Română.

Development
The IAR 37 prototype was flown for the first time in 1937 to meet a requirement for a tactical bombing and reconnaissance aircraft. The IAR 37 was an unequal-span single bay biplane with a fixed tailwheel landing gear and powered by a licensed copy of the Gnome-Rhône Mistral Major radial engine called the  IAR K14-II C32  with 870 HP. It had room for a crew of three under a continuous glazed cockpit, pilot at the front then observer and a gunner at the rear. It had dual controls and was fitted with a locally designed bombsight and a camera. The IAR 37 entered production in 1938, but production of the engine lagged, preventing the aircraft from being completed, and it was replaced on the production line by the IAR 38, powered by the reliable BMW 132 engine. As availability and reliability of the K.14 engine improved, the incomplete IAR 37s were fitted with IAR K.14-III C36 with 930 HP to allow their completion and production was switched to the improved IAR 39, which also used the IAR K.14-IV C32 with 960HP. Total production of all three types was 380, at both IAR and SET, continuing until October 1944 with the majority being IAR 39s.

Operational history
The aircraft entered service with the Royal Romanian Air Force in 1938 and, by the end of the 1940, they equipped a large number of squadrons. When Romania supported the German offensive against the Soviet Union 15 of the 18 reconnaissance squadrons were equipped with IAR biplanes. The IAR 39 was used by most of the reconnaissance squadrons involved in the 1941 offensive against the Soviet Union.

When the new post-war government was formed in 1947, a smaller number of IAR 39s were used by the new Romanian Air Force for training and liaison.

Variants
IAR 37Initial production. Powered by  IAR K14-II C32 - 649 kW (870 hp) engine. 50 built (IAR).
IAR 38Powered by 522 kW (700 hp) BMW 132A engine owing to unavailability of K14. Taller tail. 75 built (IAR).
IAR 39Revised version of IAR 38 reverting to IAR K.14-III C36 - 690 kW (930 hp) engine. 255 built (95 at IAR and 160 at SET).

Operators
 Kingdom of Romania
Royal Romanian Air Force

Romanian Air Force

Specifications (IAR 39)

See also

References

Bibliography
 Axworthy, Max. "On Three Fronts: Romania's Aircraft Industry During World War Two". Air Enthusiast, No. 56, Winter 1994. pp. 8–27. .
 Axworthy, Mark. "Third Axis, Fourth Ally: Romanian Armed Forces in the European War, 1941–1945". London: Arms and Armour. 1995.
 Morosanu, Teodor Liviu. "Romanian Reconnaissance". Air International, April 1994, Vol 46 No 4.  pp. 207–211. .

1930s Romanian military reconnaissance aircraft
1930s Romanian bomber aircraft
World War II Romanian reconnaissance aircraft
Single-engined tractor aircraft
Biplanes
Aircraft first flown in 1937
37